Carl Lindquist was chief justice of the Montana Supreme Court in 1946. He was appointed after his predecessor Howard A. Johnson resigned. A Republican, he was elected to the Montana State Senate from Daniels County.

See also
List of justices of the Montana Supreme Court

References

Justices of the Montana Supreme Court
20th-century American politicians
20th-century American lawyers
Republican Party Montana state senators